Martina Hingis and Barbara Schett were the defending champions, having won the previous edition in 2002, however both players have since retired from professional tennis.

Jasmine Paolini and Jil Teichmann won the title, defeating Astra Sharma and Rosalie van der Hoek in the final, 6–0, 6–4.

Seeds
The top seed received a bye into the second round.

Draw

Draw

References

External Links
Main Draw

Hamburg European Open - Doubles
Doubles women